"Stand Up" is a song by American metal band All That Remains. The song was released as a single from their sixth album, A War You Cannot Win, on August 13, 2012, and a music video was released to YouTube on November 19, 2012. In the U.S., it reached number one on the Mainstream Rock chart.

Track listing

Charts

References

2012 songs
2012 singles
All That Remains (band) songs
Songs written by Rob Graves
Razor & Tie singles
Songs written by Jason Costa
Songs written by Philip Labonte
Alternative metal songs